Shigetomo Yoshida (born 13 April 1890, date of death unknown) was a Japanese equestrian. He competed in the individual jumping event at the 1928 Summer Olympics.

References

External links

1890 births
Year of death missing
Japanese male equestrians
Olympic equestrians of Japan
Equestrians at the 1928 Summer Olympics
Place of birth missing